Maya Dardel is a 2017 US-Polish drama film written and directed by Zachary Cotler and Magdalena Zyzak, starring Lena Olin, Jordan Gavaris, Alexander Koch, Nathan Keyes, and Rosanna Arquette.

It premiered in the Narrative Competition at the 2017 South by Southwest Film Festival and was acquired by Samuel Goldwyn Films and Orion Pictures.

Plot
The film portrays the final weeks leading to the ambiguous disappearance of Maya Dardel, an internationally respected poet and novelist of Scandinavian origins, who has been living as a recluse for decades high up in the Santa Cruz Mountains of California. Maya announces on National Public Radio that she intends to end her life and that young male writers may compete to become executor of her estate. Men drive up the mountain and are challenged intellectually, emotionally, and erotically, until one of them begins to fathom Maya's end game.

Cast
 Lena Olin - Maya
 Alexander Koch – Paul
 Nathan Keyes – Ansel
 Jordan Gavaris – Kevin
 Rosanna Arquette – Leonora

Accolades
Cotler and Zyzak received Best Director for Maya Dardel at the 2017 Raindance Film Festival.

The film won two awards at the 2017 Prague Independent Film Festival – Best Screenplay and Best Actress (Lena Olin).

References

External links
 

2017 films
American independent films
2017 drama films
American drama films
Films about poets
2010s English-language films
2010s American films